The 1973 Cardiff City Council election was held on Thursday 10 May 1973 to elect councillors to the new Cardiff District Council (later to become known as Cardiff City Council) in Cardiff, Wales. It took place on the same day as other district council elections in the United Kingdom.

These were the first elections to the new district council, which would come into effect on 1 April 1974. The previous all-Cardiff elections to the old Cardiff City Council took place in May 1972. Future elections would take place every three years, with the next election scheduled for 6 May 1976. 

The 1973 election saw the Labour Party win a significant majority on the Council.

Background
Previously a unitary authority from 1889, Cardiff's council was to become a second-tier district authority to South Glamorgan County Council from 1 April 1974. This followed local government reorganisation enacted by the Local Government Act 1972. The 1973 election was the first to the new local authority, with councillors acting in a shadow capacity until April 1974. The election to South Glamorgan County Council had taken place in April 1973, with many Cardiff councillors standing for election to this authority. 

Until 1973, elections to Cardiff City Council had been annual, with each of the three ward councillors standing down for election in rotation. In May 1973 all ward councillors were elected at the same election, to sit for three years.

Wards
The wards to the new council remained the same in 1973 as the previous Cardiff City Council, but with the addition of two new wards: Lisvane, Llanedeyrn and St Mellons (1 seat); and Radyr, St Fagans, Tongwynlais (2 seats). Fourteen of the wards continued to have three councillors, but five wards had their representation doubled to six councillors.

The position of alderman was to be abolished, with all members of the new council being elected ward councillors.

Results
Contests took place in all except one of the wards at this election.(a)
Labour won control of the new council.

|}

Results by ward

Adamsdown

Canton

Cathays

Central

Ely

Gabalfa

Grangetown

Lisvane, Llanedeyrn and St Mellons

Llandaff

Llanishen

Penylan

Plasmawr

Plasnewydd

Radyr, St Fagans, Tongwynlais

Rhiwbina

Riverside

Roath

Rumney

South

Splott

Whitchurch

KEY

o = sitting councillor on (pre-1974) Cardiff City Council 
A = sitting alderman on (pre 1974) Cardiff City Council  Cardiff aldermen standing for election in South Glamorgan: Bella Brown, Hugh Ferguson Jones, Gordon Jones, David Purnell, Ron Richards, Gerard Turnbull, Olwen Watkin, Ron Watkiss 
+ = elected as councillor to South Glamorgan County Council in April 1973

References

Cardiff
Council elections in Cardiff
Council elections in South Glamorgan
1970s in Cardiff